Houston Regals were a men's American soccer club based in Houston, Texas that played in the national soccer league  . After a one-year hiatus, the club announced their return to the NPSL for the 2015 season in December 2014. The club again competed in NPSL in 2016, drawing their first match with Fort Worth Vaqueros, and finishing 9th in the NPSL's 11-team South Central Conference.

On December 12, 2016, Houston Regals announced open tryouts for the 2017, confirming that they would again be competing in NPSL for the 2017 season.

Year-by-year

References

External links

National Premier Soccer League teams
Association football clubs established in 2009
2009 establishments in Texas
Soccer clubs in Texas